Imshaug Peninsula is a broad, snow-covered peninsula at the south side of Lehrke Inlet on the east coast of Palmer Land, Antarctica. It was mapped by the United States Geological Survey in 1974, and named by the Advisory Committee on Antarctic Names for Henry A. Imshaug, a United States Antarctic Research Program biologist working in a long-range biosystematic study of subantarctic floras with research at the Juan Fernández Islands, 1965–66; the Falkland Islands, 1967–68; the Chilean Archipelago, 1969; Campbell Island, 1969–70; and the Kerguelen Islands, 1970–71.

References

Peninsulas of Palmer Land